The Ilford and District Football League was a football competition based in London, England.  Founded in 1918, the league covered an area from Walthamstow in the west to Romford in the east.  It consisted of up to five divisions, of which the Premier Division sat at level 13 of the English football league system. This league was a feeder to the Essex Olympian League. In the summer of 2014 it merged with the Essex Business Houses Football League to form a new combined league called the Essex Alliance Football League.

Past champions (from 1960)
In 1960 the league comprised four divisions

For the 1980–81 season the Senior Division was introduced

After the 1986–87 season the Senior Division was replaced with Division Four

After the 1995–96 season Division Four was scrapped

After the 2007–8 season Division Three was scrapped

After the 2010–11 season Division Three was re-established

After the 2011–12 season Division Three was discontinued

References

 
Football in Essex
Sports leagues established in 1918
1918 establishments in England
Defunct football leagues in England
Football competitions in London
Ilford
Sports leagues disestablished in 2014
2014 disestablishments in England